is a passenger railway station located in the city of Kawagoe, Saitama, Japan, operated by the private railway operator Tōbu Railway.

Lines
Only Semi express and Local services stop at this station.

Station layout

The station consists of a single island platform serving two tracks, connected to the station building by a footbridge. Storage sidings are located on either side of the station for track maintenance equipment.

Platforms

History

The station opened on 17 June 1914, initially named . It was renamed Shingashi on 27 October 1916.

Through-running to and from  via the Tokyo Metro Fukutoshin Line commenced on 14 June 2008.

From 17 March 2012, station numbering was introduced on the Tōbu Tōjō Line, with Shingashi Station becoming "TJ-20".

Passenger statistics
In fiscal 2019, the station was used by an average of 25,833 passengers daily.

Surrounding area

See also
 List of railway stations in Japan

References

External links

  

Tobu Tojo Main Line
Stations of Tobu Railway
Railway stations in Kawagoe, Saitama
Railway stations in Japan opened in 1914